Brittania Beach may refer to:

Britannia Beach, British Columbia - a small west coast Canadian community 
Britannia, Ottawa - a westend suburban community of Ottawa, Ontario